Epsilon Carinae (ε Carinae, abbreviated Epsilon Car, ε Car), officially named Avior , is a binary star in the southern constellation of Carina. At apparent magnitude +1.86 it is one of the brightest stars in the night sky, but is not visible from most of the northern hemisphere. The False Cross is an asterism formed of Delta Velorum, Kappa Velorum, Iota Carinae and ε Carinae. It is so called because it is sometimes mistaken for the Southern Cross, causing errors in astronavigation.

Measurements during the Hipparcos mission give the pair an angular separation of 0.46 arcseconds with a difference in magnitude of 2.0. At their estimated distance, this angle is equivalent to a physical separation of around 4 astronomical units.

The primary component has an apparent visual magnitude of 2.2, which by itself would still make it the third-brightest star in the constellation. It is an evolved giant star with a stellar classification of K0 III. However, examination of the ultraviolet flux from this star suggests it may instead be of spectral type K7. The fainter secondary companion has an apparent visual magnitude of 4.1, which, if it were a solitary star, would be bright enough to be seen with the naked eye. This is a hot, core hydrogen-fusing B-type main sequence star of spectral class B2 Vp. The secondary may itself have an orbiting stellar companion of spectral class F8. This pair may form an eclipsing binary system with a period of 785 days (2.15 years), resulting in a magnitude change of 0.12 during each eclipse.

Etymology
ε Carinae (Latinised to Epsilon Carinae) is the star's Bayer designation.

The name Avior is not classical in origin. It was assigned to the star by HM Nautical Almanac Office in the late 1930s during the creation of The Air Almanac, a navigational almanac for the Royal Air Force. Of the fifty-seven navigation stars included in the new almanac, two had no classical names: Epsilon Carinae and Alpha Pavonis. The RAF insisted that all of the stars must have names, so new names were invented. Alpha Pavonis was named "Peacock", a translation of Pavo, whilst Epsilon Carinae was called "Avior". Donald Sadler, then Superintendent of HM Nautical Almanac Office, recounted this in his memoirs but failed to explain the etymology of the invented name. In 2016, the International Astronomical Union organized a Working Group on Star Names (WGSN) to catalog and standardize proper names for stars. The WGSN's first bulletin of July 2016 included a table of the first two batches of names approved by the WGSN; which included Avior for this star.

References

Carina (constellation)
Carinae, Epsilon
Eclipsing binaries
K-type giants
B-type main-sequence stars
Avior
3307
071129
041037
CD-59 01032